Nigol Andresen (pen name, Ormi Arp; 2 October 1899 Haljala Parish, Wierland County – 24 February 1985 Tartu) was an Estonian and Soviet politician, writer, literary critic, and translator. He was a member of V Riigikogu.

In 1940 he was Minister of Foreign Affairs at Johannes Vares' cabinet.

References

1899 births
1985 deaths
People from Haljala Parish
People from Kreis Wierland
Estonian Socialist Workers' Party politicians
Communist Party of Estonia politicians
Heads of state of the Estonian Soviet Socialist Republic
Ministers of Foreign Affairs of Estonia
People's commissars and ministers of the Estonian Soviet Socialist Republic
Members of the Riigikogu, 1932–1934
Members of the Supreme Soviet of the Estonian Soviet Socialist Republic, 1947–1951
First convocation members of the Soviet of Nationalities
Estonian male poets
Estonian male short story writers
Estonian critics
Estonian translators
20th-century Estonian writers
University of Tartu alumni
Recipients of the Order of the Red Banner of Labour
Estonian prisoners and detainees
Soviet prisoners and detainees
Burials at Metsakalmistu